René de Obaldia (22 October 1918 – 27 January 2022) was a French playwright and poet. He was elected to the Académie française on 24 June 1999.

Biography
He was the great-grandson of José Domingo de Obaldía, the second President of Panama. He grew up in Paris, studying at the Lycée Condorcet before being mobilised for the army in 1940. Taken prisoner, he was sent to Stalag VIII-C (in Sagan). Even in the worst moments of this ordeal, he kept his special sense of humour. He was repatriated in 1944.

He began his career in 1960, thanks to Jacques Vilar, who presented his first major play, "Génousie," at the Théâtre national populaire.  This was followed by Le Satyre de la Villette, with André Barsacq at the Théâtre de l'Atelier, a comedy which ranked him with his literary forebears Jacques Audiberti, Ionesco, Beckett. He was, for more than fifty years, one of the most-produced French playwrights on the planet, as well as the most internationally renowned (having been translated into 28 languages).

Critics have admired the ease of Obaldia's style. His plays always take place within a framework of contemporary times and concern modern subjects, treating these in a comical manner.  In La Génousie, for example, Obaldia replaces normal speech (in French) with Genousian, a language of fantasy, dreams, and love.

In 1985 he was awarded the Grand Prix du Théâtre de l’Académie Française.

De Obaldia died in Paris on 27 January 2022, at the age of 103.

Bibliography

1949  Midi, poème
1952  Les Richesses naturelles, récits-éclairs  (Grasset)
1955  Tamerlan des cœurs, roman  (Grasset)
1956  Fugue à Waterloo, récit  (Grasset)
1956  Le Graf Zeppelin ou La passion d’Émile, récit
1959  Le Centenaire, roman  (Grasset)
1960  Génousie (T.N.P.)  (Grasset)
1961  Impromptus à loisir (Théâtre de Poche Montparnasse)  (Grasset)
1962  Le Damné (Prix Italia)  (Grasset)
1963  Le Satyre de la Villette (Théâtre de l'Atelier)  (Grasset)
1964  Les larmes de l’aveugle  (Grasset)
1964  Le Général inconnu (Théâtre de Lutèce)  (Grasset)
1965  Du vent dans les branches de sassafras (Théâtre Gramont)  (Grasset)
1965  Le Cosmonaute agricole (Biennale de Paris)  (Grasset)
1966  L’Air du large (Studio des Champs-Élysées)  (Grasset)
1966  Obaldia, «Humour secret », choix de textes. Préface by Jean-Louis Bory
1967  Urbi et orbi
1968  La Rue Obaldia (Théâtre de la Gaîté Montparnasse)
1968  … Et la fin était le bang (Théâtre des Célestins à Lyon)
1969  Les Innocentines, poèmes pour enfants et quelques adultes  (Grasset)
1971  La Baby-sitter (théâtre de l’Œuvre)  (Grasset)
1971  Deux femmes pour un fantôme (théâtre de l’Œuvre)  (Grasset)
1971  Le Banquet des méduses  (Grasset)
1972  Petite suite poétique résolument optimiste (Comédie-Française)
1973  Underground établissement : Le Damné et Classe Terminale (Théâtre Saint-Roch, Chapelle du Calvaire)
1975  Monsieur Klebs et Rosalie (Théâtre de l’Œuvre)  (Grasset)
1977  Spectacle Obaldia : Le Grand Vizir et Le Cosmonaute agricole (Théâtre du Marais)
1977  Grasse matinée  (Grasset)
1979  Le Banquet des méduses (Théâtre Montansier, Versailles)
1980  Soirée René de Obaldia (Centre Georges Pompidou)
1980  L’obscur procès de Monsieur Ménard
1980  Les Bons Bourgeois (Théâtre Hébertot)  (Grasset)
1981  Visages d’Obaldia (T.F.1)
1984  La Jument du capitaine  (Le Cherche-Midi)
1986  Endives et miséricorde (Théâtre Mouffetard)
1991  Grasse matinée (Théâtre du Marais)
1991  Les Larmes de l’aveugle, Richesses naturelles (Théâtre Espace Acteur)
1993  Les Innocentines (Théâtre 14)  (Grasset)
1993  Exobiographie, mémoires  (Grasset)
1996  Sur le ventre des veuves, recueil de poèmes
1996  Soirée Obaldia - Théâtre Molière
1999  Obaldiableries : Rappening, Pour ses beaux yeux, Entre chienne et loup (Théâtre 14)
2001  Théâtre complet. Réunion en un seul volume des pièces précitées.  (Grasset)

References

External links
  L'Académie française

1918 births
2022 deaths
People from Paris
Members of the Académie Française
Prix Décembre winners
Lycée Condorcet alumni
French centenarians
Men centenarians
Officers of the Ordre national du Mérite
Commandeurs of the Légion d'honneur
Commandeurs of the Ordre des Arts et des Lettres
Commanders of the Order of Cultural Merit (Monaco)
French Army personnel of World War II
French prisoners of war in World War II
World War II prisoners of war held by Germany